Pit Bull: The Battle over an American Icon by Bronwen Dickey is a book about the history of pit bulls in the United States.

Conception
Bronwen Dickey spent seven years researching with dog experts. For Dickey's efforts she received death threats at book signings.

Content

The book covers the history of the Pitbull, in the United States. It covers how the dog went from beloved family pet owned by likes of Teddy Roosevelt to demonized dog fighting animal owned by the likes of Ed Faron and Michael Vick.

Reception
The book received a mostly positive reception from critics.

This is a very good book... Ms. Dickey has earned her reputation as a first-rate reporter.” —The Wall Street Journal.

"Terrific... [Dickey] does more than simply dispel the many myths around pit bulls; she strives to explore what those myths can tell us about ourselves. This beautifully written, heartbreaking book is not just for dog lovers — it's for anyone interested in race, class, history and the complexity of media narratives." —NPR

Ms. Dickey not only writes about the ebb and flow of public fear and loathing, she takes the reader on a thoroughly comprehensible tour of genetics and behavioral science to explain why breeding never guarantees an individual dog's personality, and shouldn't be used to condemn it.... Picking out one breed to blame is neither warranted nor effective, and a reader of her book will be hard put to disagree." —The New York Times

“Brilliant… A powerful and disturbing book that shows how the rise of the killer-pit bull narrative reflects many broader American anxieties and pathologies surrounding race, class, and poverty… A remarkable study of our capacities for cruelty and compassion toward dogs and other humans, and an eloquent argument for abandoning the fears and prejudices that have made pit bulls in particular the victims of mistreatment.” —Christian Science Monitor

Anti pit bull advocates accused Bronwen Dickey of downplaying the potential danger of pit bull dogs.

References

2016 non-fiction books
Books about science
Natural history books
History books about the United States
Dogs in the United States
Alfred A. Knopf books